GD-ROM (an abbreviation of "Gigabyte Disc Read-Only Memory") is a proprietary optical disc format originally used for the Dreamcast video game console, as well as its arcade counterpart, the Sega NAOMI and select Triforce arcade board titles. It was developed by Yamaha to curb piracy common to standard CDs and to offer increased storage capacity without the expense of the fledgling DVD-ROM. It is similar to the standard CD-ROM except that the pits on the disc are packed more closely together, resulting in a higher storage capacity of 1 gigabyte, a 42% increase over a conventional CD's capacity of 700 megabytes.

The Dreamcast ended up being the only sixth-generation console with a disc based on CD technology rather than DVD technology; even the Nintendo GameCube's smaller 8 cm discs held 50% more data due to being based on DVD technology. In addition, GD-ROM proved to be an ineffective anti-piracy measure when it was discovered the Dreamcast's forgotten MIL-CD functionality could be exploited to boot games burned to CD albeit with some content removed.

After the discontinuation of the Dreamcast worldwide on March 31, 2001, Sega continued to use the GD-ROM format in arcades with the Sega NAOMI 2, Triforce and Sega Chihiro. With the release of the Sega Lindbergh in 2005, Sega moved on to DVD discs and continued to use satellite and internet technology in the arcade. The last disc-based Naomi 2 and Triforce games were released in 2006 which marked the final releases using the GD-ROM format.

History
The format was developed for Sega by Yamaha, and first commercially appeared with the Dreamcast's Japanese launch in November 1998. GD-ROM was created because the standard CD-ROM was prone to piracy and reaching the limits of its storage capacity, while implementing the then brand-new DVD-ROM technology would have made console production too costly. However, the Dreamcast did retain the ability to read standard CD-ROM discs, and thus still suffered from software piracy as bootleggers managed to fit certain games on CDs and exploit the Dreamcast console's compatibility with the MIL-CD format. The main difference between GD-ROM and MIL-CD is that MIL-CD can boot on an unmodified Dreamcast like original SEGA's disk, making piracy extremely easy. At the end of 1999 Sega released a new revision of the Dreamcast hardware which was not able to boot MIL-CDs, therefore preventing piracy.

Before the Dreamcast was released, Sega "confirmed that Dreamcast owners will one day be able to upgrade the GD-ROM drive to DVD," as information indicated Sony's upcoming PlayStation 2 would use the DVD format with its much larger capacity 4.7 GB single-layered up to 8.5 GB double-layered discs compared to the 1 GB capacity of the GD-ROM. Despite displaying a Dreamcast DVD display unit at E3 2000, the plans for a DVD add-on or fully separate unit never materialized during the short production run of the Dreamcast. 

GD-ROM was also made available as an upgrade for the Dreamcast's arcade cousin, Sega NAOMI and the later Sega NAOMI 2, providing alternate media to its cartridge-based software. It is also used as an option on both the Sega Chihiro and Triforce.

Regions
There are three data areas on a GD-ROM disc. The first is in conventional CD format, and usually contains an audio track with a warning that the disc is for use on a Dreamcast, and can damage CD players. These vary by region. This section is 4 minutes long with the data size of 35 MB. 

The CD section also contains a data segment, which is only readable in PCs. Although most discs include only text files identifying the game, its copyright and bibliography, some contain bonus material for home computer users (for example, Sonic Adventure contains images of Sonic characters to use on the desktop). There then follows a separator track which contains no data except for the text Produced by or under license from Sega Enterprises LTD Trademark Sega (Similar to the Sega Saturn, it was believed that the security key was stored in this area to prevent piracy). The final (outer) section of the disc contains the game data itself in a higher density format. This section is 112 minutes long (almost two hours), with a data size of 1.0 GB.

A normal CD-reader will not read beyond the first track because, according to the CD table of contents (TOC), there is no data there. With modified firmware on a few optical drive models that looks for a second TOC in the high-density region it is possible to read data from the high-density region. One can also utilize a "swap-trick" by first letting the CD-reader read the TOC from an audio CD with a special 99 minute TOC and then swapping that disc with a GD-ROM in a way that avoids alerting the CD-reader that a new disc has been inserted.  It is then possible to read as much data from the high-density region as indicated by the TOC from the first disc.

The most popular way to access data from GD-ROMs, however, is to use the Dreamcast itself as a drive, and copy the data to a computer by means of a "coder's cable" or a Dreamcast Broadband Adapter. Another alternative is modding the Dreamcast to add a USB connector.
Sega has discontinued production of GD-ROM media.

Warnings 
The second section (in conventional CD format) usually contains a message informing users that the disc can damage AV equipment. This is possible because a CD player can interpret the game data track as an audio track, which will result in loud noise being played through the speakers. Different discs, usually varying by region, contain different messages.

NTSC-U discs usually contain the message, "Warning: This disc is only for use on Sega Dreamcast.", "This disc is for use only on Sega Dreamcast." or "This is a Dreamcast game disc. The first track contains game data. Please, do not play it on a normal CD player." Some discs contain light-hearted or humorous messages from the game's characters (for example, Skies of Arcadia gives the message, "We can't save the world from a CD player, so just put us back in the Dreamcast so we can do our job!"). This is also common on NTSC-J discs.

PAL region discs contain the message, "This is a Dreamcast disc, and is for use only on a Dreamcast unit. Playing this disc on a hi-fi or other audio equipment can cause serious damage to its speakers. Please stop this disc now." The message is also repeated in French, German, Spanish and Italian. Some PAL region games, however, use the NTSC messages.

Technical information
The GD-ROM in the Dreamcast works in constant angular velocity (CAV) mode, like the majority of modern optical drives. Very old CD-ROM drives read with a constant linear velocity (CLV) design, however (usually 12× or slower). Sega achieved the higher density by decreasing the speed of the disc to half and by letting the standard CD-ROM components read at the normal rate thus nearly doubling the disc's data density. This method allowed Sega to use cheaper off-the-shelf components when building the Dreamcast.

The NetBSD project has developed a GDRom driver for NetBSD. A port of that driver for Linux exists, though due to licensing issues and the poor compatibility of that driver with Linux kernel interfaces, a new Linux driver is under development.

Linux kernel 2.6.25 comes with support for the GD-ROM drive on the Dreamcast.

See also 
Nintendo optical discs
Double-density compact disc
MIL-CD
Universal Media Disc

References

External links
 Sega's GD-ROM Presentation

Computer-related introductions in 1998
120 mm discs
Dreamcast
Sega hardware
Video game distribution